Bayat is a town of Afyonkarahisar Province in the Aegean region of Turkey. It is the seat of Bayat District. Its population is 4,182 (2021). The mayor is Kadir Üçer (CHP).

Name 
Bayat is one of a number of towns and villages in Anatolia named after a branch of the Oghuz Turks, who migrated west from the Turkish homelands in Central Asia between 1100 and 1300 AD.

References 

Populated places in Afyonkarahisar Province
Bayat District, Afyonkarahisar
Bayat tribe